The Harold A. (H.A.) Doyle House is a historic house in Yankton, South Dakota. It was built in 1924 for Harold A. Doyle, a trial lawyer, and designed in the American Craftsman style by architect William L. Steele. It has been listed on the National Register of Historic Places since October 25, 1990.

References

		
National Register of Historic Places in Yankton County, South Dakota
Houses completed in 1924
1924 establishments in South Dakota
American Craftsman architecture in South Dakota